El Noi de la Mare (The Child of the Mother) is a traditional Catalan Christmas song. The song was made famous outside Spain by Andrés Segovia who used to perform Miguel Llobet's guitar transcription as an encore.

Lyrics
The main stanza has four verses and begins mostly with Què li darem a n'el Noi de la Mare? In some traditional ways of singing the song every pair of verses is repeated twice. The first stanza of a common version is:

Variants
The text exists in other slightly different variants.

Classical vocal arrangements have been made by Joaquín Nin-Culmell for soprano and John Rutter for choir.

A version of this in English has been reworked and developed to produce the carol "What Shall we Give?" as sung by the Mormon Tabernacle Choir.

Recordings
 (anon.) Title track of El Noi de la Mare, Mother and Son Zefiro Torna, Cécile Kempenaers, Els van Laethem, Jan van Elsacker and Lieven Termont (2006) 
 (anon.) Catalan Songs (Victoria de Los Angeles album)
 (anon.) José Carreras Sings Catalan Songs

See also
 List of Christmas carols

References

External links

 Wikisource

Catalan-language songs
Christmas carols
Songwriter unknown
Year of song unknown